Manu Needhi Consumer and Environmental Protection Centre is a non-profit organisation, registered under the Tamil Nadu Societies Registration Act, 1975. It was formed by then law students of Dr.Ambedkar Law College, Chennai, most of whom are now the practicing advocates in Madras High Court, Chennai.

Executive members

There are seven executive members:
 A. Muniraja - president
 Akila Arunkumar- vice president
 S. Saravanan - general secretary
 P. Saravana Siva - joint secretary
 R. Senthil Kumar - treasurer
 M. Manikhandan - committee member
 Sindhuja Seenivasaga Perumal

Consumer protection
Manu Needhi works to create awareness to the consumers about their rights by conducting periodical campaigns. Further, they provide free legal aid  to the consumers to get their grievance redressed legally in consumer courts. They also file public interest litigation.

Awareness campaigns
Personnel at the centre have organised awareness campaigns around issues that affect the public at large, including campaigns in remote villages and a mass voters' awareness rally.

Articles and publications
The president and vice-president of the organization have been known to write articles related to consumer rights that have been published in newspapers and magazines of India, especially in Tamil Nadu.

References

 

Consumer protection in India
Environmental protection agencies
Organisations based in Tamil Nadu
Organizations with year of establishment missing